Stojan Tintor (born 29 June 1955) is a politician in Serbia. He served in the National Assembly of Serbia from 2004 to 2007 and the Assembly of Vojvodina from 2004 to 2016, and he was the mayor of Temerin from 2004 to 2008. He was a member of the far-right Serbian Radical Party during his political career, although in 2014 he provided support to the centre-left Democratic Party in a pivotal confidence vote in the Vojvodina assembly.

Private career
Tintor graduated from the University of Novi Sad's Faculty of Electrical Engineering in 1979, with a focus on energy.

Politician

Municipal politics
Tintor sought election to the Temerin municipal assembly in the 2000 Serbian local elections, running as the Radical candidate in the municipality's tenth division. He was defeated; the Radicals did not win any seats in the assembly in 2000. This was the last local electoral cycle in Serbia in which candidates were elected in constituency seats; all subsequent local elections have been held under a system of proportional representation.

Serbia introduced the direct election of mayors in the 2004 local elections. Tintor ran as the Radical Party's candidate in Temerin and was elected in the second round. He served in this role for the next four years. Serbia abandoned the direct election of mayors after the 2004 cycle; since then, mayors have been chosen by the elected members of city and municipal assemblies.

Tintor appeared in the lead position on the Radical Party's electoral list for Temerin in the 2008 Serbian local elections and took a mandate when the list won eleven seats in the local assembly. (For the 2008 local elections, all mandates were assigned to candidates on successful lists at the discretion of the sponsoring parties or coalitions.  Tintor did not automatically receive a mandate by virtue of leading the list.) Although the Radicals won the greatest number of seats in the local assembly, they fell short of a majority, and Tintor did not continue as mayor. The Radicals experienced a serious split later in 2008, with several party members joining the more moderate Serbian Progressive Party under the leadership of Tomislav Nikolić and Aleksandar Vučić. Tintor remained with the Radicals.

Serbia's electoral system was reformed yet again in 2011, such that mandates in local, provincial, and parliamentary elections were awarded in numerical order to candidates on successful lists. Tintor again led the Radical list for Temerin in the 2012 Serbian local elections and was re-elected when the list won four seats. He was not a candidate for re-election in 2016.

Parliamentarian
Tintor appeared in the seventy-seventh position on the Radical Party's list in the 2003 Serbian parliamentary election. The list won eighty-two seats, and Tintor was chosen as a member of the party's delegation when the assembly met in January 2004. (From 2000 to 2011, mandates in Serbian parliamentary elections were awarded to sponsoring parties or coalitions rather than individual candidates, and it was common practice for the mandates to be assigned out of numerical order. Tintor's position on the list had no specific bearing on his chances of election.) Although the Radicals won more seats than any other party, they fell well short of a majority and ultimately served in opposition. Tintor served a full term in the assembly; he was a member of the committee for industry and the committee for science and technological development.

Tintor was included on the Radical Party's lists for the 2007 and 2008 parliamentary elections, although he was not awarded a mandate on either occasion. Following the 2011 electoral reform, Tintor appeared in the 121st position on the Radical Party's list in the 2012 Serbian parliamentary election and the 107th position in the 2014 election. The party did not cross the electoral threshold on either occasion.

Provincial politics
From 2004 to 2012, half of the mandates in the Vojvodina provincial assembly were determined by election in single-member constituencies, and the other half were determined by proportional representation. Tintor was elected to the provincial assembly for the Temerin constituency in the 2004 and 2008 provincial elections. In the 2012 provincial election, he appeared in the fourth position on the Radical Party's list and was re-elected when the list won five mandates. The Radicals served in opposition throughout this period.

In 2014, Tintor provided support to a new provincial administration led by Bojan Pajtić in a key vote of confidence. Some online sources suggest that he crossed the floor from the Radicals to the Democratic party at this time, although this does not appear to have happened. In any event, he was not a candidate for re-election in 2016.

Electoral record

Provincial (Vojvodina)

Municipal (Temerin)

References

1955 births
Living people
People from Temerin
Members of the National Assembly (Serbia)
Members of the Assembly of Vojvodina
Serbian Radical Party politicians